The Berliner Rugby Club is a German rugby union club from Berlin, currently playing in the Rugby-Bundesliga.

History
The club was formed in 1926.

While very successful in its youth department, it has not managed similar achievements on the senior level.

The club has yet to win a national championship, having appeared in the 1989 German rugby union championship final, where it lost 6-20 to TSV Victoria Linden. Two lost Cup finals also stand to its name.

In the 2007-08 Rugby-Bundesliga season, the club finished in fourth place, its best result in the league since adoption of the single-division format in 2001. The 2008-09 season started not as successful with the team sitting in seventh place, just above the relegation zone but good results in the second half of the season saw it finish in fourth place and qualify for the finals. In the semi-finals, SC 1880 Frankfurt proved to strong, defeating BRC 36-15.

With the first team struggling in the Bundesliga because of a number of injuries, the club was forced to withdraw its reserve team from the second division in October 2011, with the players from the side being moved to the first and third team instead.

A league reform in 2012 allowed the club to stay in the league after initially having been relegated as the Bundesliga was expanded from ten to 24 teams. BRC finished first in their group in the 2012-13 season and qualified for the north/east division of the championship round, where it came second. The club was knocked out in the quarter finals of the play-offs after a 7–49 loss to TV Pforzheim.

The club finished second in the north-east championship round  in 2013–14, beat RG Heidelberg 31-24 first round of the play-offs and was knocked out by Heidelberger RK in the semi finals. In the 2014–15 season the club finished fourth in the north-east championship group but was knocked out of the first round of the play-offs after a 49–0 oss to RK Heusenstamm.

Club honours
 German rugby union championship
 Runners up: 1989
 German rugby union cup
 Runners up: 1983, 1989
 German sevens championship
 Runners up: 2006

Recent seasons
Recent seasons of the club:

First team

 Until 2001, when the single-division Bundesliga was established, the season was divided in autumn and spring, a Vorrunde and Endrunde, whereby the top teams of the Rugby-Bundesliga would play out the championship while the bottom teams together with the autumn 2nd Bundesliga champion would play for Bundesliga qualification. The remainder of the 2nd Bundesliga teams would play a spring round to determine the relegated clubs. Where two placing's are shown, the first is autumn, the second spring. In 2012 the Bundesliga was expanded from ten to 24 teams and the 2nd Bundesliga from 20 to 24  with the leagues divided into four regional divisions.

Reserve team

Rugby internationals
In Germany's 2006–08 European Nations Cup campaign, Colin Grzanna, Krystian Trochowski, Gerrit van Look and Franck Moutsinga were called up for the national team.

In the 2008–10 campaign, Grzanna and van Look and appeared for the BRC and Germany again, while Raphael Hackl was a new addition to the club's list of internationals.

In the 2010–12 campaign, no player from the club was selected to play for Germany.

The club had one player selected for the German under-18 team at the 2009 European Under-18 Rugby Union Championship, Samy Füchsel. Füchsel also played at the 2010 tournament.

References

External links
  Official website
 Berliner RC team info at totalrugby.de
 Tables and results of German rugby on rugbyweb.de

German rugby union clubs
Rugby clubs established in 1926
Rugby union in Berlin
1926 establishments in Germany